Mihalgazi, formerly Gümele (Before 1927), is a town and district of Eskişehir Province in the Black Sea Anatolia region of Turkey. According to 2010 census, population of the district is 3,876 of which 1,730 live in the town of Mihalgazi. She borders İnhisar to the west, Yenipazar to the northwest, Sarıcakaya to the east and Tepebaşı (Eskişehir) to the south. Mihalgazi has four boroughs and five villages. Alpagut and Sakarılıca, who are 2 of these villages,  have a municipality. She 35 km away from Eskişehir. She was part of Eskişehir sanjak between 1292- second half of 15th century. She was part of Göynük township of Bursa sanjak between second half of 15th one - 16th one, her of Bolu sanjak between 16th century - 1894. She bounded to İnhisar nahiya in Söğüt township of Bilecik sanjak between 1894 and 1923. She was part of Söğüt district of Bilecik Province between 1923-1946 and became a township and changed her name as Mihalgazi in 1927 after People of Gümele repulsed attacks of Greeks troops, who marched from Söğüt and Eskişehir during Turkish War of Independence in 1921. She bounded to Central District of Eskişehir Province in 1946 and Sarıcakaya district of her in 1958. She had a municipality in 1967. She finally a district of Eskişehir Province in 1990. She is famous with hot spring in Sakarılıca.

Notes

References

External links
 District governor's official website 
 District municipality's official website 
 Map of Mihalgazi district

Towns in Turkey
Populated places in Eskişehir Province
Districts of Eskişehir Province